Butcher Hill is a summit in Wood County, West Virginia, in the United States.

The hill has the name of the local Butcher family of pioneer settlers.

References

Landforms of Wood County, West Virginia
Hills of the United States